Taeŭng station is a railway station in Taeŭng-ri, Kimhyŏngjik-kun, Ryanggang Province, North Korea, on the Pukpu Line of the Korean State Railway.

History

The station was opened on 3 August 1988 by the Korean State Railway, along with the rest of the second section of the Pukpu Line between Chasŏng and Huju.

References

Railway stations in North Korea